Colobothea pleuralis is a species of beetle in the family Cerambycidae. It was described by Casey in 1913. It is known from Costa Rica and Panama.

References

pleuralis
Beetles described in 1913